This is an alphabetical list of jazz trombonists for whom Wikipedia has articles.

A–B

Ray Anderson (born 1952)
Troy Andrews (Trombone Shorty)
David Baker (1931–2016)
Dan Barrett (born 1955)
Lucien Barbarin (1956–2020)
Chris Barber (1930–2021)
Conny Bauer (born 1943)
Johannes Bauer (1954–2016)
Eddie Bert (1922–2012)
Harold Betters (1928–2020)
Jeb Bishop (born 1962)
Big Bill Bissonnette (1937–2018)
Bert Boeren (born 1962)
Luis Bonilla (born 1965)
Richard B. Boone (1930–1999)
Joseph Bowie (born 1953)
Tom Brantley (born 1970)
Bob Brookmeyer (valve trombone, 1929–2011)
Garnett Brown (1936–2021)
Lawrence Brown (1907–1988)
Marshall Brown (1920–1983)
Tom Brown (1888–1958)
George Brunies (1902–1974)
Papa Bue (1930–2011)

C–F
 Gordon Campbell
 Jimmy Cheatham (1924–2007)
 George Chisholm (1915–1997)
 Emile Christian (1895–1973)
 Jimmy Cleveland (1926–2008)
 Marty Cook (born 1947)
 Michael Conner
 Willie Cornish (1875–1942)
 Hal Crook (born 1950)
 Elmer Crumbley (1908–1993)
 Michael Davis (born 1961)
 Steve Davis (born 1967)
 Raul de Souza (1934–2021)
 Michael Dease (born 1982)
 Willie Dennis (1926–1965)
 Vic Dickenson (1906–1984)
 Tommy Dorsey (1905–1956)
 Don Drummond (1932–1969)
 Billy Eckstine (musician and singer) (1914–1993)
 Eddie Edwards (1891–1963)
 Bob Enevoldsen (1920–2005)
 Robin Eubanks (born 1955)
 Mike Fahn (born 1960)
 John Fedchock (born 1957)
 Glenn Ferris (born 1950)
 Carl Fontana (1928–2008)
 Bruce Fowler (born 1947)
 Curtis Fowlkes (born 1950)
 Hugh Fraser (1958–2020)
 Curtis Fuller (1932–2021)

G–L
Robert Gale
Vincent Gardner (born 1972)
Clark Gayton (born 1963)
Matthew Gee (1929–1979)
Marshall Gilkes (born 1978)
Tyree Glenn (1912–1974)
Wycliffe Gordon (born 1967)
Brad Gowans (1903–1954)
Bennie Green (1923–1977)
Charlie Green (1900–1936)
Urbie Green (1926–2018)
Al Grey (1925–2000)
Slide Hampton (1932–2021)
Bill Harris (1916–1973)
Craig Harris (born 1953)
Jimmy Harrison (1900–1931)
Bob Havens (born 1930)
Thamon Hayes (1899–1978)
Wayne Henderson (1939–2014)
Conrad Herwig (born 1959)
J. C. Higginbotham (1906–1973)
Dave Horler (born 1943)
Bill Hughes (1930–2018)
Pee Wee Hunt (1907–1979)
Quentin Jackson (1909–1976)
Carol Jarvis (born 1977)
J. J. Johnson (1924–2001)
Ward Kimball (1914–2002)
Craig Klein
Jimmy Knepper (1927–2003)
René Laanen (born 1952)
Frank Lacy (born 1959)
Nils Landgren (born 1956)
George E. Lewis (born 1952)
Melba Liston (1926–1999)
Frederick Lonzo (born 1950)

M–P
Radu Malfatti (born 1943)
Tom "Bones" Malone (born 1947)
Albert Mangelsdorff (1928–2005)
Delfeayo Marsalis (born 1965)
Andy Martin
Elliot Mason (born 1977)
Rob McConnell (valve trombone)
Clarence Horatius Miller (1922–1992)
Glenn Miller (1904–1944)
Grover Mitchell (1930–2003)
Miff Mole (1898–1961)
Grachan Moncur III (1937–2022)
James Morrison (born 1962)
Benny Morton (1907–1985)
Turk Murphy (1915–1987)
Christian Muthspiel (born 1962)
Tricky Sam Nanton (1904–1946)
Dick Nash (born 1928)
Louis Nelson (1902–1990)
Sammy Nestico (1924–2021)
Ed Neumeister (born 1952)
Mark Nightingale (born 1967)
Kid Ory (1886–1973)
Roy Palmer (1887–1963)
James Pankow
Frank Parr (1928–2012)
Åke Persson (1932–1975)
Jim Pugh (born 1950)
Julian Priester (born 1935) 
Douglas Purviance (born 1952)

R–T
 Frank Rehak (1926–1987)
 Bill Reichenbach (born 1949)
 Ilja Reijngoud (born 1972)
 Nelson Riddle (1921–1985)
 George Roberts (1928–2014)
 Jim Robinson (1892–1976)
 Rico Rodriguez (1934–2015)
 Barry Rogers (1935–1991)
 Dennis Rollins (born 1964)
 Gabriel Rosati (born 1966)
 Frank Rosolino (1926–1978)
 Gregory Charles Royal (born 1961)
 Roswell Rudd (1935–2017)
 Tony Russell (1929–1970)
 Sonny Russo (1929–2013)  
 Louis Satterfield (1937–2004)
 Don Sebesky (born 1937)
 Dick Shearer (1940–1997)
 Even Kruse Skatrud (born 1977)
 Tom and Matt Smith
 Pete Strange (1938–2004)
 Steve Swell (born 1954)
 Rob Swope (1926–1967)
 Jack Teagarden (1905–1964)
 Aage Teigen (1944–2014)
 Eje Thelin (1938–1990)
 Sebi Tramontana (born 1960)
 Steve Turre (born 1948)

U–Z
Gary Valente (born 1953)
Jonathan Voltzok
Bill Watrous (1939–2018)
Harry Watters
Dicky Wells (1907–1985)
Fred Wesley (born 1943)
Ron Westray (born 1970)
Jiggs Whigham (born 1943)
Annie Whitehead (born 1955)
Spiegle Willcox (1903–1999)
Phil Wilson (born 1937)
Wolter Wierbos (born 1957)
Steve Wiest (born 1957)
Vaughn Wiester (born 1945)
Kai Winding (1922–1983)
Nils Wogram (born 1972)
Britt Woodman (1920–2000)
Trummy Young (1912–1984)
Jerry Zigmont (born 1956)

References

 
Trombonists
Trombone
Trombonists